There were a number of Zulu Regiments (known sometimes as "Impis"). Most were created during the reign of Shaka Zulu. This is a list of them.

List of Regiments

Divisions 
 Belebele Brigade/Division	
 Izim-Pohlo (Bachelors) or Isi-Klebe Division

Notes

References

Army units and formations of South Africa